Esra Akcan is a Turkish-American architect, academic and author. Currently, she is the Michael A. McCarthy Professor in the Department of Architecture and the director of European Studies at Einaudi Center for International Studies at Cornell University.

Akcan’s research on modern and contemporary architecture and urbanism focuses on the intertwined histories of Europe and West Asia, and on understanding architecture’s role in global, social and environmental justice. Akcan has also authored over 150 research articles on critical and postcolonial theory, racism, immigration, architectural photography, translation, neoliberalism, and global history.

Akcan has received numerous awards and fellowships including Carter Manny Award from Graham Foundation and the Berlin Prize from American Academy in Berlin.

Education 
She completed her Bachelors and Master’s degree in architecture from the Middle East Technical University in Turkey. She then moved to USA and earned her M.Phil., Ph.D. and postdoctoral degrees from Columbia University in New York.

Career 
Akcan has taught at University of Illinois at Chicago, Humboldt University in Berlin, Columbia University, New School, Pratt Institute in New York, and METU in Ankara. She is appointed as Professor of architecture at Cornell University.

Research
Akcan’s research on modern and contemporary architecture and urbanism explains the intertwined histories of the world, with special emphasis on Europe and West Asia. She specializes in architectural history and theory, along with migration and diaspora studies. Her research explores the geopolitically conscious design practice, critical and postcolonial theory, immigration, translation, racism, architectural photography and neoliberalism.

Akcan’s books offer new ways of understanding the global movement of architecture, local and distant producers, and also the receivers of architecture. Her book ‘’Architecture in Translation: Germany, Turkey and the Modern House’’ extends the notion of translation beyond language to visual fields. It advocates a commitment to a new culture of translatability from below and in multiple directions for cosmopolitan ethics and global justice. This book is reviewed as an “indispensable reading” and a work that “sets the stage for future work”  Kyle Evered, from Michigan State University, reviewed the book as “clearly a ‘next step' in scholarly works … also an ideal ‘first step’ toward analyzing more critically the dynamics of interaction and exchange that we today otherwise generalize under terms like modernization, globalization, or development…. The most readable and thoughtful history of ideas”.

‘’Turkey: Modern Architectures in History’’, published in 2012 and co-authored with Sibel Bozdoğan, was reviewed by Bülent Batuman, as “well beyond a descriptive overview of modern Turkish architecture”. He stated that the book provided a “masterfully told history of Turkish architecture from the 1920s to the 2010s” and that it is “a very well written text, easy to read for even non-architects”

Akcan published ‘’Open Architecture: Migration, Citizenship and the Urban Renewal of Berlin-Kreuzberg by IBA-1984/87’’ in 2018. This book defines open architecture as the translation of a new ethics of hospitality into design process and focuses on formal, programmatic and procedural steps towards open architecture during the urban renewal of Berlin’s immigrant neighborhood.  In a positive review of the book, Clemens Filkenstein wrote that “Open Architecture, with its innovative methodology and style, becomes a manifesto to propagate not only spaces of hospitality but the writing of ‘open architectural history.’”

Awards and honors 
2009 - Canadian Center for Architecture (CCA) Visiting Scholar
2010 - Arnheim-Professor at Institut für Kunst- und Bildgeschichte, Humboldt University, Berlin.
2011 - Fellow, Clark Art Institute
2011 - Millard Meiss Publication Grant for Architecture in Translation through Duke University Press, College Art Association
2012 - Fellow, Rechtskulturen at the Forum Transregionale Studien
2016 - 2017 - Berlin Prize, American Academy in Berlin
2017 - Graham Foundation Publication Grant for Open Architecture
2019 - Research Fellow, Canadian Center for Architecture
2019 - 2020 - Frieda Miller Fellow, Radcliffe Institute for Advanced Study at Harvard University

Bibliography

Selected books in English 
(Land) Fill Istanbul: Twelve Scenarios for a Global City/Dolgu Istanbul: Küresel Sehre Oniki Senaryo (2004) 
Turkey: Modern Architectures in History (2012, with Sibel Bozdoğan) 
Architecture in Translation: Germany, Turkey and the Modern House (2012) 
Open Architecture: Migration, Citizenship and the Urban Renewal of Berlin-Kreuzberg (2018) 
Building in Exile - Bruno Taut: Turkey 1936-1938 (2019) 
Abolish Human Bans: Intertwined Histories of Architecture (2022)

Selected articles 
Homo oeconomicus of the ‘New Turkey’: Urban Development of Istanbul in the 2000s, Neoliberalism on the Ground: Architecture and Transformation from the 1960s to the present, Kenny Cupers, Catharina Gabrielsson, and Helena Mattsson (eds) (Pittsburgh: University of Pittsburgh Press, 2020)
How does architecture heal? AKM as Palimpsest and Ghost South Atlantic Quarterly 118/1, special issue edited by Bülent Küçük and Ceren Özselçuk, January 2019, pp. 81–89.
Translation Theory and the Intertwined Histories of Building for Self-Governance, in 'Terms of Appropriation, Ana Miljacki, Amanda Lawrance (eds.) (London: Routledge, 2018)
Is a Global History of Architecture Displayable? A Historiographical Perspective on the 14th Venice Architecture Biennale and Louvre Abu Dhabi, Art Margins, vol.4, no.1 (January 2015): 79-101. 
Off the Frame: The Panoramic City Albums of Istanbul in Photography’s Orientalism'' (Los Angeles: Getty Publications, 2013): 93-115

See also 
 Samia Henni
 Rosalys Coope
 Martha Levisman
 Simon Pepper (professor)

References 

Living people
American people of Turkish descent
Middle East Technical University alumni
Columbia University alumni
Cornell University faculty
Architectural historians
Architectural theoreticians
Year of birth missing (living people)